Valerie Joyce Korinek (born December 11, 1965)  is a Canadian historian.  She is a professor of history at the University of Saskatchewan and a Fellow of the Royal Society of Canada. Her research focuses on Queer studies and communities.

Early life and education
Korinek was born on December 11, 1965. Korinek earned her Bachelor of Arts degree from the University of Toronto Mississauga and her Master's degree and PhD from the University of Toronto.

Career
Upon completing her PhD, Korinek joined the faculty at the University of Saskatchewan in 1996. She received a post-it-note from her colleague Gary Hanson which read "You should contact these people. You'd find them interesting." As she was becoming acclimated with her new position, she did not contact the people on the note until 1997. Once she contacted former librarian Neil Richards, she began reading his collection of LGBTQ archives and became interested in sharing the work. As she began working with Richards, Korinek published her first book titled Roughing it in the Suburbs: Reading Chatelaine Magazine in the Fifties and Sixties through the University of Toronto Press.

In 2018, Korinek released her second book titled Prairie Fairies: A History of Queer Communities and People in Western Canada, 1930-1985
which received the Canadian Historical Association's Clio Prize for the prairie region. The book focused on the lived experiences of LGBTQ youth in Western Canada, specifically Saskatoon, Regina, Winnipeg, Edmonton and Calgary, during the 20th century. While working alongside Richards to conduct research for the book, she came across a photo of Annie Maude "Nan" McKay kissing Hope Weir which became the cover photo for her book. As there were few images, letters, or diaries about prairie lesbians prior to the 1950s, Korinek stated that the photo "claims important space for historians to do more than merely suggest that lesbians existed in the prairies prior to the Second World War." The book also went on to win the Canadian Studies Network Best Book in Canadian Studies Prize and the English-Language Book Prize from the Canadian Committee on Women's and Gender History. It was also nominated for two Saskatchewan Book Awards; the University of Saskatchewan Non-Fiction and Jennifer Welsh Scholarly Writing categories.

Following the publication of Prairie Fairies, Korinek was appointed vice-dean faculty relations in the College of Arts & Science for a five-year term. In this role, she earned an Insight Grant from the Social Sciences and Humanities Research Council of Canada to study the history of same-sex marriage in Canada. In 2020, Korinek was elected a Fellow of the Royal Society of Canada.

Selected publications
Prairie Fairies: A History of Queer Communities and People in Western Canada, 1930-1985 (2018)
Roughing it in the Suburbs: Reading Chatelaine Magazine in the Fifties and Sixties (2000)

References

Living people
1965 births
Canadian women historians
Canadian women non-fiction writers
Fellows of the Royal Society of Canada
University of Toronto alumni
Academic staff of the University of Saskatchewan
Writers from Toronto